Frederick George Topham, VC (10 August 1917 – 31 May 1974) was a Canadian recipient of the Victoria Cross, the highest award for gallantry in the face of the enemy that can be awarded to British and Commonwealth forces.

Early life and Second World War
Born in York Township, Toronto, Canada, on August 10, 1917, Topham was educated here at King George Public School and Runnymede High School (now Runnymede Collegiate Institute) before working in the mines at Kirkland Lake.

Topham enlisted in the Canadian Army during the Second World War on August 3, 1942, and served at home and abroad as a medical orderly, initially with the 48th Highlanders of Canada, before transferring to the Royal Canadian Army Service Corps (RCASC). However, he volunteered for service with the Canadian Army's airborne forces and found himself in the 1st Canadian Parachute Battalion, with whom he was to remain for the rest of the war. He trained in Canada with the battalion which, in the summer of 1943, was sent to England where it became part of Brigadier James Hill's 3rd Parachute Brigade of the British 6th Airborne Division, commanded by Major General Richard Gale. The division had been earmarked for an assault role for the upcoming invasion of Normandy, then scheduled for the spring of 1944, and highly intensive training continued with an ever heightening intensity. In the early hours of June 6, 1944 (now known as D-Day) Topham's battalion dropped into Normandy (see Operation Tonga) as part of Operation Overlord and, after being engaged in heavy fighting, during which time the battalion sustained heavy losses, spent the next two months on the defensive (contrary to what the airborne troops had been trained for) before pursuing the retreat German forces to the River Seine (see 6th Airborne Division advance to the River Seine). In September, after almost three months of fighting, the division was withdrawn to England.

In December the division, now commanded by Major General Eric Bols, was sent to Belgium where it played a relatively minor role in the Battle of the Bulge. Topham's battalion gained the distinction of being the only Canadian Army units to fight in the battle. During Operation Varsity, the Western Allies' attempt to cross the River Rhine, on March 24, 1945, while serving with the battalion, commanded by Lieutenant Colonel Jeff Nicklin, he defied heavy enemy fire to treat casualties sustained in a parachute drop east of the Rhine, near Wesel. Rejecting treatment for his own severe face wound, he continued to rescue the injured for two hours. While returning to his company, he saved three occupants of a burning carrier which was in danger of exploding. For these exceptional deeds, Topham was awarded the Victoria Cross, the highest decoration for valour in the British Commonwealth.

Details
He was 27 years old, and a corporal (medical orderly) in the 1st Canadian Parachute Battalion, Canadian Army during the Second World War when the following deeds took place for which he was awarded the VC:

Post-War
Topham's heroism was acknowledged publicly with a parade and civic reception in Toronto on August 8, 1945; one hundred members of the 1st Canadian Parachute Battalion served as a guard of honour. After the war, Topham took little part in military affairs. On November 10, 1945 he laid the cornerstone of the new Sunnybrook Memorial Hospital for Veterans.  Topham served briefly as a Constable with the Toronto Police Department before moving onto a career with Toronto Hydro.

Topham died on May 31, 1974 from a heart attack, in the Borough of York and is buried at Sanctuary Park Cemetery, Etobicoke, Canada.

Legacy
Topham's medals were on loan to the Canadian War Museum, but were not permanently on display. His widow declared in her will that the medals should be sold.

The Corporal Fred Topham, VC Fundraising Project was formed by members of the 1st Canadian Parachute Battalion Association and The Queen's Own Rifles of Canada to retain the medal in Canada. Topham's medals were eventually acquired from his family for $300,000 after a large fundraising campaign. On March 24, 2005, on the 60th anniversary of Corporal Topham's VC action, the 1st Canadian Parachute Battalion Association presented Topham's medals to the Canadian War Museum in Ottawa, where they will be on permanent display.

The Ontario Heritage Foundation, erected a plaque at the Etobicoke Civic Centre in 1980 commemorating Corporal Frederick Topham, V.C. (1917–74). This plaque has since been erected outside Runnymede College Institute.

A 2 hectare park in the former East York segment of Toronto, near St. Clair Avenue East and O'Connor Drive was named for Topham.  It features three ball diamonds, two lit tennis courts, a wading pool, a children's playground, and the Topham Park Community Centre and Clubhouse.

See also
George J. Peters posthumously awarded the Medal of Honor for an action during the same operation, on the same day
Stuart S. Stryker posthumously awarded the Medal of Honor for an action during the same operation, on the same day

References

External links
 Canadian Government website biography and citation: TOPHAM, Frederick George 
 Biography and Photography of Fred Topham by The 1st Canadian Parachute Battalion Preservation Association C Company
 

1917 births
1974 deaths
Canadian World War II recipients of the Victoria Cross
Royal Canadian Army Service Corps soldiers
Canadian Army personnel of World War II
Military personnel from Toronto
1st Canadian Parachute Battalion